A belt is a flexible band or strap, typically made of leather, plastic, or heavy cloth, worn around the natural waist or near it (as far down as the hips). The ends of a belt are free; and a buckle forms the belt into a loop by securing one end to another part of the belt, at or near the other end. Often, the resulting loop is smaller than the hips. Belts come in many lengths because of the variety in waist sizes, and most belts can be adjusted at the buckle to suit the wearer's waist.

Description 
Belts are used variously to secure or hold up clothing, such as trousers, shorts, and skirts; to carry objects, such as tools and weapons; and to define or accentuate the waist.

Some garments have a series of belt loops at the waist, through which a belt can be threaded. Additionally, many belts have a "keeper loop" affixed to one end, near the buckle. The keeper loop stops the free end of the belt from flapping around once the belt is buckled. Some belts also have an end tip (made of metal or leather) covering the free end of the belt to protect it from damage. 

On dresses, robes, and gowns, belts do not hold up the garment but may draw in its waist and define or accentuate it. These garments, because they maintain their position on the body by hanging from the shoulders or by friction against the torso, do not need belts in order to stay up. The breadth of belts worn with such garments need not be limited by the size of belt loops: some wide belts called waist cinchers overlap with corsets in appearance and function.

Belts that do hold up clothing work by friction and often take advantage of the narrow circumference (and the compressibility) of the torso above the hips. (Suspenders, also used to hold up such clothing as trousers, rely not on friction, compression, and the waist–hip proportion, but on maintaining distance between the shoulders of the wearer and the waist of the garment: the garment is held up by suspension (hanging), without need for the friction and compression of a belt; and the same principle applies in bib overalls. A garter belt (also called a suspender belt) employs both methods: the belt maintains its position on the body by friction and/or compression at or near the waist and/or by being smaller than the hips, and it maintains stockings' position on the legs by suspension. A sock garter works in the same way as a suspender belt, but for one leg only, the upper band of the garter being worn around the thigh or the calf, rather than the waist. A plain garter, a band worn on one leg to hold up hosiery, works like a belt, using friction and compression.)

Belts often are used as fashion accessories, with many colours, styles, and finishes. In heavy metal subculture, bullet belts and studded belts are worn. Belt buckles, often made of metal, vary from simple, one-color finishes to elaborately decorated belt plates with embossed or bas-relief images or multicolored logos. Pouches to carry objects, such as coin purses, holsters, scabbards, and inrōs, can be attached to belts and used instead of a garment's pockets. Many belts are marketed for one sex or the other, despite their universal functionality.

History

Belts have been documented as male clothing since the Bronze Age. Both sexes have used them off and on, depending on the fashion trends. In the western world, belts have been more common for men, with the exception of the early Middle Ages, late 17th century Mantua, and skirt/blouse combinations between 1901 and 1910. Art Nouveau belt buckles are now collectors' items.
In the latter half of the 19th century and until the First World War, the belt was a decorative as well as utilitarian part of military uniform, particularly among officers. In the armed forces of Prussia, Tsarist Russia, and other Eastern European nations, it was common for officers to wear extremely tight pressing into their stomachs and gutting them up, wide belts around the waist, on the outside of the uniform, both to support a saber and for aesthetic reasons. These tightly cinched belts served to draw in the waist and give the wearer a trim physique, emphasizing wide shoulders and a pouting chest. Often the belt served only to emphasize the waist made small by a corset worn under the uniform, a practice which was common especially during the Crimean Wars and was often noted by soldiers from the Western Front. Political cartoonists of the day often portrayed the tight waist-cinching of soldiers to comedic effect, and some cartoons survive showing officers being corseted by their inferiors, a practice which surely was uncomfortable but was deemed to be necessary and imposing.

In modern times, men started wearing belts in the 1920s, as trouser waists fell to a lower line. Before the 1920s, belts served mostly a decorative purpose, and were associated with the military. Moreover, prior to that trousers did not even have belt loops. As sportswear, trousers with belt loops were already present in the 19th century. Today it is common for men to wear belts with their trousers. In the US military belts are worn snugly at dress events or at inspection so as convey impressions of fitness and discipline. From 1989 onward the US military standards regarding belt tightness during normal duty and non-duty activities have been somewhat more relaxed to prevent deleterious effects of prolonged excessive abdominal constriction.

In some countries, a father's belt could be associated with corporal punishment. As belts are constructed out of materials like leather that are both strong and light, a belt can be easily wielded to produce intense pain by using it as a whip to strike the buttocks of a misbehaving child. Moreover, belts were convenient disciplinary tools, as they are generally immediately available for use. The belt can symbolize fatherly authority and paternal responsibility for one's children's behavior and moral development, but corporal punishment is not recommended for use in modern society as it was in the past.

Since the 1980s and more commonly in the mid-1990s, the practice of sagging the pants, in which the waistbands (usually secured by a cinched belt) of trousers or (typically long) shorts are worn at or below the hips, thereby exposing the top part of any underwear not obscured by an upper-body garment, has been seen among young men and boys, especially among those who are black and consanguine with hip-hop culture and fashion. This practice is believed to have originated with prison gangs and the prohibition of belts in prison (due to their use as weapons and as devices for suicide) -- historically, including in the latter part of the 20th century, gang-affiliated young men and boys were expected to wear their belts fastened tightly.

Materials 
Leather is the most popular belt material because it can withstand being bent, folded, and tightened without being damaged. Genuine leather belts will also adapt to the wearer with time. Belts are also made using a range of other materials, including braided leather, tooled leather, suede, leather-backed ribbon, canvas, webbing, rope and vinyl.

Fashion and formality 

Belts have transformed from a strictly utilitarian item, to a fashion accessory in today's modern era. There are several unspoken rules for belts when it comes to belt shape and color, especially for men wearing suits, vs. a woman's choice of belt that is rooted in fashion trend, and not out always out of necessity.

Formal 
Belts for formal dress pants/attire are usually 28–32 mm wide (a little under 1 inch). These belts offer specialty accents such as trapunto straps, beveled edges, fine stitch gauge, and a tapered tip. The leather, if it is made of leather, is commonly in a semi or high-shine finish (ex: spazzalato leather), with a tight grain, and a smooth leather backing. Dress belts typically have a buckle in a polished metal finish.

Casual 
Casual belts commonly worn with denim are usually between 35 mm and 42 mm wide (a little under 1 inch). These are typically made out of a one-piece leather construction with a textured appearance, with a belt buckle in an antiqued finish, wider, thicker stitching, or bar-tacking, to ensure a strong construction.

Gallery

See also
Utility or tool belt: An example of a utility belt is a police duty belt. A notable fictional example is Batman's utility belt.
Studded belt: A studded belt is typically made of leather or similar materials, and is decorated with metal studs (see gallery above). Studded belts are often a part of punk/emo scene, rave, skater, goth and metal fashion.
 Japanese video game designer Tetsuya Nomura has used extra belts in character designs for video game characters such as Lulu from Final Fantasy X and Sora in Kingdom Hearts II to create fantasy clothing.
 Armband
 Bandolier
 Baldric
 Belt buckle
 Belting (beating)
 Black belt (martial arts)
 Championship belt
 Cummerbund
 Drawstring
 Girdle
 Haramaki (clothing)
 Obi
 Sam Browne belt
 Sash
 Stable belt
 Strap
 Waistband

References

Belts (clothing)
Medieval European costume
Leather goods